Arlington Reef is one of the major coral reefs of the Great Barrier Reef in the Coral Sea. The reef is located roughly 40 km north-east of Cairns. The Australian Institute of Marine Science first survey the corals of Arlington Reef in 1987 and has been subsequently monitoring them since then.

References

Great Barrier Reef
Reefs
Coral Sea